The Incarnate Word Cardinals football program is the intercollegiate American football team for the University of the Incarnate Word (UIW) located in San Antonio, Texas. The program began in 2009 and originally competed in NCAA Division II as members of the Lone Star Conference. In 2013, the school moved to Division I. For the 2013 season, UIW competed as a member of the Southland Conference for all sports except football. Football competed with an 11-game schedule as an Independent. UIW began playing Southland football in the 2014 season. The team plays its home games at the 6,000 seat Gayle and Tom Benson Stadium.

History
UIW held its first team practice on August 27, 2008, and began competing as an NCAA Division II independent on August 29, 2009.

Conference Affiliations

2009: Division II Independent
2010–2012: Lone Star Conference
2013: FCS Independent
2014–present: Southland Conference

Coaches

*Ivicic served as interim head coach for the final three games of 2011, completing Santiago's third season as coach

Conference Championships
UIW has won 3 Southland Conference championships, two shared and one outright.

† Co-champions

Playoff appearances

NCAA Division I-AA/FCS
The Cardinals have participated in the NCAA Division I FCS playoffs three times. Their combined record is 3–3.

Year-by-year results

Stadium

UIW home football games are played on campus at Gayle and Tom Benson Stadium. Benson Stadium was dedicated on September 1, 2008 and currently seats 6,000 people. It is named after Tom Benson and his wife Gayle, whose generous monetary donations helped start up the UIW football program. Record stadium attendance of 6,498 was recorded in a game against Houston Baptist on November 17, 2016. UIW currently has an overall home record at the stadium of 40–34.

All-time record vs. Southland teams 

Official record (including any NCAA imposed vacates and forfeits) against all current Southland opponents:

Record against FBS competition
Overall (2–7)

Individual awards

Walter Payton Award winners

The Walter Payton Award is awarded annually to the most outstanding college offensive player in the Division I Football Championship Subdivision (formerly Division I-AA) as chosen by a nationwide panel of media and college sports information directors.
2022 – Lindsey Scott Jr.

Jerry Rice Award winners

The Jerry Rice Award is awarded annually to the most outstanding freshman player in the Division I Football Championship Subdivision (formerly Division I-AA) of college football as chosen by a nationwide panel of media and college sports information directors.
2020–21 – Cameron Ward

Southland Conference Award winners

Player of the Year
2022 – Lindsey Scott Jr., Quarterback

Offensive Player of the Year
2021 – Cameron Ward, Quarterback

Defensive Player of the Year
2022 – Kelechi Anyalebechi, Linebacker

Newcomer of the Year
2015 – Myke Tavarres, Linebacker
2021 – Taylor Grimes, Wide Receiver

Freshman of the Year
2018 – Jon Copeland, Quarterback
2020–21 – Cameron Ward, Quarterback

Coach of the Year
2018 – Eric Morris
2021 – Eric Morris

Football Student-Athlete of the Year
2022 – Kelechi Anyalebechi, Linebacker

All-Americans

Players in the NFL

Players in the CFL

Future non-conference opponents

See also
 List of NCAA Division I FCS football programs

References

External links
 

 
American football teams established in 2007
2007 establishments in Texas